Germanton may refer to:

 Germanton, North Carolina, United States
 the former name of Holbrook, New South Wales, Australia

See also 

 Germantown
 Jermantown